"Natural" is a song by American pop rock band Imagine Dragons, whose members co-wrote the song with Justin Tranter, Klinsmann Lucas S. Bernardo and their producers Mattman & Robin. It was released by Kidinakorner and Interscope Records on July 17, 2018, serving as the lead single from the band's fourth studio album, Origins (2018), as well as the seasonal anthem of the 2018 ESPN College Football. It became their fifth number one song on the US Hot Rock Songs chart.

Background
Lead singer Dan Reynolds noted that "Natural" is about "finding yourself and being willing and able to stand up to whatever adversity comes your way". He said in a press release announcing the song: "Living in a dog-eat-dog world can bring out the worst in you, and sometimes, the best. It would be a lie to tell you I haven't become somewhat skeptical about some things in the last decade of my life. However, I believe that when you truly learn to love yourself, the judging eyes and hateful words become meaningless."

The song was chosen by ESPN as the anthem of the 2018 College Football season. It is the second time that an Imagine Dragons song was chosen, the first being "Roots" in 2015. "'Natural' embodies the energy, spirit and drama of each team's journey to the College Football Playoff, and that is why it was chosen as this year's anthem," said Emeka Ofodile, ESPN vice president of sports marketing. It is also part of the soundtrack for EA Sports' NHL 19.

Composition
"Natural" is a pop rock song which features a "mix of explosive drums and inspiring lyrics", with "stadium-rocking instrumentation" over the chorus.

Critical reception
Markos Papadatos of Digital Journal regarded "Natural" as a "well-crafted and well-produced song", writing that "Reynolds' voice is impressive, raw and powerful", and that the song "garners two thumbs up". Sam Tornow of Billboard described the song as "ferocious" and "smash-mouth". Mike Wass of Idolator named the song a "radio-ready anthem", expecting it to be "another smash" following the success of the band's third studio album Evolve (2017). Tiana Timmerberg of Radio.com called the song "energetic and inspiring", deeming it "a feel-good jam with positive and empowering lyrics".

Music video
A music video for the song was released on August 24, 2018. It depicts frontman Dan Reynolds as the apparent owner of a spooky house including shots of a woman in a bathtub, the same woman being pursued by other inhabitants of the house and an abnormally tall man resembling Slenderman, a supposed funeral for the woman, Wayne Sermon, Ben McKee and Daniel Platzman fading into dust, Reynolds digging a grave and burying the woman alive, and other shots of the house and its inhabitants, along with a clip of a lion mauling a zebra.
Its music video has received over 500 million views and 5 million likes.

Live performances
On July 19, 2018, Imagine Dragons made a live television debut of the single on Jimmy Kimmel Live!. The performance featured a guitar solo by lead guitarist Wayne Sermon that expanded on the studio recording.

Personnel
Credits adapted from Tidal.
 Mattman & Robin – production, engineering
 Serban Ghenea – mixing

Charts

Weekly charts

Year-end charts

Decade-end charts

Certifications

Release history

References

External links
 

2018 singles
2018 songs
Imagine Dragons songs
American pop rock songs
Song recordings produced by Mattman & Robin
Songs written by Ben McKee
Songs written by Dan Reynolds (musician)
Songs written by Daniel Platzman
Songs written by Justin Tranter
Songs written by Mattias Larsson
Songs written by Robin Fredriksson
Songs written by Wayne Sermon
Kidinakorner singles
Interscope Records singles